DYFM (837 AM) Bombo Radyo is a radio station owned and operated by Bombo Radyo Philippines through its licensee People's Broadcasting Service. It serves as the flagship station of the Bombo Radyo Network. Its studio and offices are located at Bombo Radyo Broadcast Center, 6th, 7th & 8th Floors Sky City Tower, Mapa St., Iloilo City, while its transmitter is located at Brgy. Lobuc, Lapuz, Iloilo City.

References

Radio stations in Iloilo City
News and talk radio stations in the Philippines
Radio stations established in 1966
Bombo Radyo Philippines